George William Johnson (November 10, 1869 – February 24, 1944) was a lawyer and Democratic politician who served as United States Representative from West Virginia.

Early life
He was born near Charles Town, West Virginia, in Jefferson County on November 10, 1869. He attended the common schools and Shepherd University in Shepherdstown, West Virginia.

Career

Law
Johnson graduated from West Virginia University at Morgantown in 1894 and from the law department of the same university in 1896. He was admitted to the bar and practiced law in Martinsburg. He served as city attorney of Martinsburg and then moved to Parkersburg in 1900, continuing to practice law.

Johnson served as a member of the board of regents of the State Normal School from 1897 to 1900. He served as Referee in Bankruptcy for the United States District Court of West Virginia and general counsel to the West Virginia Public Service Commission. During this time he also grew fruit and raised stock.

Politics

Johnson was elected in 1922 to the 68th Congress, only serving two years as his bid for re-election in 1924 was unsuccessful. He was elected in 1932 to the 73rd Congress, and this time won re-election to the four succeeding Congresses. His re-election bid in 1942 was not successful.

Death
He died in Martinsburg on February 24, 1944, and was buried in Edgehill Cemetery in Charles Town.

References

1869 births
1944 deaths
People from Charles Town, West Virginia
Politicians from Parkersburg, West Virginia
West Virginia lawyers
Shepherd University alumni
West Virginia University College of Law alumni
Politicians from Martinsburg, West Virginia
West Virginia city attorneys
Democratic Party members of the United States House of Representatives from West Virginia
Lawyers from Martinsburg, West Virginia